Zohran Kwame Mamdani (born October 18, 1991) is a Ugandan-born American politician. He is the assembly member for the 36th district of the New York State Assembly, in Queens. Mamdani was elected after defeating incumbent Democrat Aravella Simotas in the 2020 primary.

Early life and education 
Mamdani is the son of academic Mahmood Mamdani, the director of the Makerere Institute of Social Research (MISR), and filmmaker Mira Nair. Born and raised in Kampala, Uganda, Mamdani  moved to New York City when he was seven. He is a Muslim. Mamdani graduated from Bowdoin College in 2014.

Career 
Mamdani worked as a foreclosure prevention counselor before running for office. 

After leading student organizing campaigns, Mamdani became formally involved in politics when he volunteered for New York City Council candidate Khader El-Yateem, a Palestinian Lutheran minister running in Bay Ridge, Brooklyn in 2017, then he was the campaign manager for Ross Barkan's race for New York State Senate in 2018, and a field organizer for Tiffany Cabán's campaign for Queens District Attorney in 2019, before running for Assembly himself.

On January 29, 2021, Mamdani hosted a video for the Gravel Institute discussing the housing crisis in the United States.

New York Assembly
In 2019, Mamdani announced his campaign for New York State Assembly in the 36th district, which encompasses Astoria and Long Island City in Queens. During the campaign, Mamdani was endorsed by the Democratic Socialists of America and ran on statewide rent control, fare-free transit, and single-payer healthcare in New York. Mamdani's narrow victory over four-term incumbent Aravella Simotas took almost a month to call.

Political views
Mamdani started to consider himself a democratic socialist following the 2016 presidential campaign of Bernie Sanders.

See also
 Indians in the New York City metropolitan area

References

1991 births
Living people
Bowdoin College alumni
21st-century American politicians
Democratic Socialists of America politicians from New York
Politicians from Queens, New York
New York (state) socialists
New York (state) Democrats
People from Kampala
Ugandan emigrants to the United States
American politicians of Indian descent
Ugandan people of Indian descent
Asian-American people in New York (state) politics
American Muslims
Ugandan Muslims
Muslim socialists